Yoshizawa Ayame (吉沢菖蒲) is a stage name taken on by a series of Kabuki actors in Japan. Founded by one of the most famous onnagata (specialists in female roles) of all time, three of the four actors to succeed him were his direct relatives.

Lineage
Yoshizawa Ayame I (1690s-1729) - Quoted in the treatise "Actors' Analects" (Yakusha Rongo), Ayame I's advice and insights into onnagata acting remains fundamental today.
Yoshizawa Ayame II (September 1729 - July 1754) - Son of Ayame I.
Yoshizawa Ayame III (November 1764 - November 1774) - Son of Ayame I.
Yoshizawa Ayame IV (November 1778 - September 1792) - Adopted son of Ayame II.
Yoshizawa Ayame V (November 1807 - August 1810) - Son of Ayame III.

References
The Line of Yoshizawa Ayame at Kabuki21.com

Kabuki actors
Cross-gender male actors